General elections were held in Ivory Coast on 29 November 1970 to elect a President and National Assembly. At the time the country was a one-party state with the Democratic Party of Ivory Coast – African Democratic Rally (PDCI-RDA) as the sole legal party. Its leader Félix Houphouët-Boigny was elected president unopposed, whilst in the National Assembly election, a list of 100 PDCI-RDA candidates (chosen from 650 applicants by the party's executive authorities) for the 100 seats (increased from 85 at the previous elections) was presented to the electorate for approval. Voter turnout was reported to be 98.9% in the parliamentary election and 99.2% in the presidential election.

Results

President

National Assembly

References

Ivory
1970 in Ivory Coast
Presidential elections in Ivory Coast
One-party elections
Single-candidate elections
Elections in Ivory Coast
November 1970 events in Africa